Andreas Krause may refer to:
Andreas Krause (admiral) (born 1956), German Navy admiral
Andreas Krause (footballer born 1957), East German football midfielder
Andreas Krause (footballer born 1967), German football defender and poker player
Andreas Krause Landt (born 1963), German publisher